Albert Rémy (9 April 1921 – 26 January 1967) was a French actor best known for his supporting roles in François Truffaut's first two feature films. He played Antoine Doinel's father in The 400 Blows and Charlie Koller's (Charles Aznavour) brother in Shoot the Piano Player. He also appeared in Marcel Carné's Les Enfants du Paradis, John Frankenheimer's The Train and René Clément's Is Paris Burning?

Selected filmography 

 Strange Inheritance (1943) - L'ivrogne (uncredited)
 It Happened at the Inn (1943) - Jean des Goupi
 Madame et le Mort (1943) - Henri
 Goodbye Leonard (1943) - Le marchand d'oiseaux
 Love Story (1943) - Le sacristain (uncredited)
 The Woman Who Dared (1944) - Marcel
 Children of Paradise (1945) - Scarpia Barrigni
 The Black Cavalier (1945) - Pinte
 La Boîte aux rêves (1945)
 François Villon (1945) - Perrot
 La part de l'ombre (1945)
 La Fille du diable (1946) - Clément
 Devil in the Flesh (1947) - Le sacristain
 Les Amants du pont Saint-Jean (1947) - Le beau-frère du noyé
 The Lost Village (1947) - Un montagnard
 The Charterhouse of Parma (1948)
 Parade du rire (1948) - Piton
 Impeccable Henri (1948) - Gustave
 Croisière pour l'inconnu (1948) - Albert
 Ronde de nuit (1949) - L'homme nu
 All Roads Lead to Rome (1949) - Edgar
 Maître après Dieu (1951) - Le cuistot
 Alone in Paris (1951) - Arthur
 Une fille dans le soleil (1953) - Vergèze
 Les amours finissent à l'aube (1953) - Picard, un employé du garage
 Au diable la vertu (1953) - Henri
 Légère et court vêtue (1953) - Henri (uncredited)
 Virgile (1953) - Bastien
 Minuit... Champs-Élysées (1954) - Etienne
 Wild Fruit (1954) - Louis
 Before the Deluge (1954) - Le garçon de café
 La bella Otero (1954) - Un sergent de ville
 Razzia sur la chnouf (1955) - Bibi
 French Cancan (1955) - Barjolin
 Je suis un sentimental (1955) - Ledoux
 The Affair of the Poisons (1955) - Le bourreau Guillaume
 Les Hussards (1955) - Un hussard (uncredited)
 Elena and Her Men (1956) - Buchez
 Paris, Palace Hotel (1956) - Le ronfleur du commissariat
 Crime and Punishment (1956) - L'inspecteur Renaud
 The Hunchback of Notre Dame (1956) - Jupiter
 Que les hommes sont bêtes (1957) - L'inspecteur
 Escapade (1957) - José
 Les Truands (1957) - L'agent de police
 Rafles sur la ville (1958) - Auguste, dit "Gus"
 Police judiciaire (1958) - L'inspecteur Valentin
 Miss Pigalle (1958)
 In Case of Adversity (1958) - Le commissaire à la préfecture (uncredited)
 Cigarettes, whisky et p'tites pépées (1959)
 The 400 Blows (1959) - Julien Doinel
 The Cow and I (1959) - Colinet - prisonnier de guerre dans la scierie
 Pantalaskas (1960) - Georges Battistini
 Dialogue with the Carmelites (1960) - Un sans-culotte
 Tomorrow Is My Turn (1960)
 Shoot the Piano Player (1960) - Chico Saroyan
 Le Caïd (1960) - Bob (uncredited)
 The Black Monocle (1961) - Mérignac - le bibliothécaire
 Four Horsemen of the Apocalypse (1962) - François
 Lafayette (1962) - Louis XVI
 The Seventh Juror (1962) - Police Superintendent
 Portrait-robot (1962)
 Gigot (1962) - Alphonse
 Five Miles to Midnight (1962) - L'inpecteur
 Mandrin (1962) - Grain de sel
 A King Without Distraction (1963) - Le maire
 La foire aux cancres (Chronique d'une année scolaire) (1963) - Le serrurier
 Bebert and the Train (1963) - Le Brigadier Belissard
 Behold a Pale Horse (1964) - (uncredited)
 The Train (1964) - Didont
 Weekend at Dunkirk (1964) - Virrel
 Mata Hari, Agent H21 (1964) - Adam Zelle, Mata Hari's Father
 Cent briques et des tuiles (1965) - Etienne
 Les Bons Vivants (1965) - Inspecteur Graunu (segment "Bons vivants, Les")
 Is Paris Burning? (1966) - Policeman / Le gendarme
 Grand Prix (1966) - Surgeon
 La Vingt-cinquième Heure (1967) - Joseph Grenier (posthumous release)
 An Idiot in Paris (1967) - Rabichon, le restaurateur (posthumous release)
 Shock Troops (1967) - Emile (posthumous release)
 The Oldest Profession (1967) - Frenchman with 2 sous (segment "Mademoiselle Mimi") (uncredited) (final film role, posthumous release)

References

External links

1921 births
1967 deaths
French male film actors
People from Sèvres
20th-century French male actors